Epsilon Island may refer to:

 Epsilon Island (Antarctica) 
 Epsilon Island (Bermuda) 
 Epsilon Island (Western Australia)